József Réder (5 February 1951 – 19 March 2008) was a Hungarian boxer. He competed in the men's heavyweight event at the 1972 Summer Olympics. At the 1972 Summer Olympics, he lost to Ion Alexe of Romania.

References

External links
 

1951 births
2008 deaths
Hungarian male boxers
Olympic boxers of Hungary
Boxers at the 1972 Summer Olympics
People from Tatabánya
Heavyweight boxers
Sportspeople from Komárom-Esztergom County
20th-century Hungarian people